The Bayer designation Chi Hydrae (χ Hya / χ Hydrae) is shared by two star systems, in the constellation Hydra:
χ1, HR 4314
χ2, HR 4317

Hydrae, Chi
Hydra (constellation)